Jorda Glacier is a glacier, about  long, draining the eastern slopes of the Churchill Mountains between Mount Coley and Pyramid Mountain and merging with the lower Nursery Glacier just before the latter enters the Ross Ice Shelf. It was named by the Advisory Committee on Antarctic Names for Lieutenant Commander Henry P. Jorda, U.S. Navy, a pilot with Squadron VX-6 during Operation Deep Freeze I, 1955–56.

References

Glaciers of the Ross Dependency
Shackleton Coast